Oriental Daily News is one of Malaysia's daily Chinese-language newspapers, published in broadsheet format. It was officially launched on New Year's Day 2003. The newspaper group is owned by KTS Group,  a Sarawak timber company founded by late Datuk Lau Hui Kang.

The newspaper actually published its first issue on 29 September 2002, but its publication's permit was suspended by the Malaysian Home Ministry. The suspension was subsequently lifted in December 2002. It was reported a large numbers of journalists from the Nanyang Press and China Press left to join this newspaper group.

In 2014, Oriental Daily News was endorsed by the Malaysian branch of FIABCI (de) as the official Chinese newspaper for the Malaysia Property Awards.

References

External links 
 

2002 establishments in Malaysia
Publications established in 2002
Newspapers published in Malaysia
Chinese-language mass media in Malaysia